Mask Singer is a Chinese reality singing competition television series based on the Masked Singer franchise which originated from the South Korean version of the show King of Mask Singer. It premiered on Jiangsu Television on 18 September 2016.

Season

Season 1

Season 2

Season 3

Season 4

Controversy
Production company of the original version, Munhwa Broadcasting Corporation (MBC) has yet to receive payment from Chinese production company who bought the license rights to remake the series. The case ultimately went to China International Economic and Trade Arbitration Commission and the MBC won.

References

2016 Chinese television series debuts
Chinese-language television shows
Chinese television series based on South Korean television series
Masked Singer
Television controversies in China